Southfield Township is a civil township of Oakland County in the U.S. state of Michigan. The population was 14,547 at the 2010 census.

Organized in 1830, the township once occupied a much larger area before the cities of Lathrup Village and Southfield incorporated into cities in 1953 and 1958.  Today, the township occupies  and contains and administers the villages of Beverly Hills, Bingham Farms, and Franklin.  The unincorporated part of the township, which belongs to no village, occupies  with a population of 19 at the 2010 census.

History
Southfield Township, originally known as Ossewa Township, came into existence on July 12, 1830. The name was changed to Southfield Township seventeen days later. The village of Franklin was an early community established in the fall of 1828. Only a handful of parcels remain outside the borders of the township's three villages.

The city of Lathrup Village was incorporated out of the east side of the township on May 12, 1953. The village of Franklin incorporated on November 8, 1953, the village of Bingham Farms on June 7, 1955, and the village of Beverly Hills (originally named the Village of Westwood) in April 1958. The city of Southfield was incorporated on April 28, 1958.

Geography

Demographics
As of the census of 2000, there were 14,430 people, 5,612 households, and 4,214 families residing in the township. The racial makeup of the township was 92.39% White, 3.62% African American, 0.13% Native American, 2.17% Asian, 0.01% Pacific Islander, 0.29% from other races, and 1.38% from two or more races. Hispanic or Latino of any race were 1.23% of the population.

There were 5,612 households, out of which 32.9% had children under the age of 18 living with them, 67.4% were married couples living together, 5.5% had a female householder with no husband present, and 24.9% were non-families. 21.7% of all households were made up of individuals, and 10.1% had someone living alone who was 65 years of age or older.  The average household size was 2.55 and the average family size was 2.99.

In the township the population was spread out, with 24.7% under the age of 18, 3.7% from 18 to 24, 25.3% from 25 to 44, 27.6% from 45 to 64, and 18.7% who were 65 years of age or older.  The median age was 43 years. For every 100 females, there were 94.8 males.  For every 100 females age 18 and over, there were 90.2 males.

The median income for a household in the township was $97,719, and the median income for a family was $109,249. Males had a median income of $83,609 versus $50,957 for females. The per capita income for the township was $51,328.  About 1.3% of families and 1.9% of the population were below the poverty line, including 1.1% of those under age 18 and 1.7% of those age 65 or over.

Education
The Birmingham City School District provides public school services to the township.

References

External links

Southfield Township Information from Village of Bingham Farms

Townships in Michigan
Townships in Oakland County, Michigan
Metro Detroit
1830 establishments in Michigan Territory
Populated places established in 1830